Kanetake is a masculine Japanese given name. Notable people with the name include:

, Japanese anime mechanical designer
, Japanese samurai and scholar
, Japanese politician and bureaucrat

Japanese masculine given names